Abrahamia is a genus of flowering plants in the family Anacardiaceae found in Madagascar.

Taxonomy

Species

, the World Checklist of Selected Plant Families accepts 34 species:

References

Anacardiaceae
Endemic flora of Madagascar
Anacardiaceae genera